John Eales AM (born 27 June 1970) is an Australian former rugby union player and the most successful captain in the history of Australian rugby. In 1999, he became one of the first players to win multiple Rugby World Cups.

Early life
Eales went to school at Marist College Ashgrove, in Ashgrove. In his youth, Eales was a cricket all-rounder and played first grade cricket for Queensland University in the Brisbane QCA cricket competition. Eales completed a Bachelor of Arts degree with a double major in psychology from the University of Queensland in 1991 prior to taking to the international rugby stage.

Rugby career
Eales played lock for Queensland Reds and Australia. He was given the nickname "Nobody" because "Nobody's perfect".

Eales' 55-cap time as captain marked an era of Australian success in world rugby. Eales played a part in Australia's victories at the Rugby World Cup, first in 1991, and later in 1999. He took over the captaincy from Phil Kearns.

Statistics

Eales scored 173 points for Australia – 2 tries (one valued at 4, one at 5), 34 penalties and 31 conversions – a total which, as of April 2013, places him 12th on the all-time scoring list for Australia. He is the highest scoring forward in Test rugby history and, as of November 2015, only one of seven forwards to have surpassed 100 points in Test rugby (the others being Richie McCaw, Jean Prat, Takashi Kikutani, Colin Charvis, Mamuka Gorgodze and Carlo Checchinato). This is largely because of his goal kicking, which is unusual for a forward; his two tries are unremarkable (in comparison, all of Checchinato's, Charvis's and McCaw's points have come from tries).

Eales captained Australia on 60 occasions, 55 times in Test matches, making him the second most capped Wallaby captain after George Gregan (59). As of 2017, he is ranked seventh in games played as international captain. As of 2017, Eales' 86 caps make him the fourth most capped forward in Australia's Test rugby history, and joint 9th on the overall list.

Eales played 20 Tests against the All Blacks, winning 11 and losing 9. Of those 20 Tests, he captained the Wallabies 11 times, winning 6 and losing 5. 
Eales is one of only 21 players to have represented the Queensland Reds in 100 or more state games - he represented his state in 112 games. He scored a total of 402 points in the Super 12 competition with 6 tries, 66 conversions and 80 penalties for the Queensland Reds. No forward has scored more points than him in the competition's history.

He is one of a select group to have won the Rugby World Cup twice.

He retired as the most-capped lock of all time, with 84 Test appearances in that position (his other two Tests were as a number eight). Eales has since been surpassed in caps as a lock by several players.

Post-playing career

Business
Eales was a founder of the Mettle Group and his personal company the JohnEales5. He is also a director of Flight Centre Travel Group and Magellan Financial Group and has been a columnist for The Australian newspaper. He is also engaged as a consultant for Westpac. He is also a non-executive director at Fuji Xerox.

Sport ambassador, mentor and boards
Eales acted as a "rugby ambassador" at the 2007 Rugby World Cup in France, which involved a number of media duties and fulfilled the role as an Athlete Liaison Officer for the Australian Olympic Committee in the Athens, Beijing and 2012 London Olympics.

He is also an Ambassador for the Australian Indigenous Education Foundation, Hearts in Union and the Melanoma Institute Australia.

Together with Bond University, he presents the annual John Eales Rugby Excellence Scholarship which includes one-on-one mentoring with Eales.

Author
Eales has written two books, Learning From Legends, Sport, and a Business version.

Academia
Eales is an occasional lecturer at University of Notre Dame.

Personal life
Politically, Eales supported Australia's becoming a republic in the runup to the 1999 Australian republic referendum.

Eales' son, Elijah Eales, plays for the Mosman Cricket Club in Sydney Grade Cricket.

Honours
 Eales was named the 2002 Queenslander of the Year.
 The annual award for the best Australian rugby union player is known as The John Eales Medal, John Eales Medal.
 In 1999 he was made a Member of the Order of Australia (AM) for services to the community and rugby.
 On 30 August 2000, he was awarded the Australian Sports Medal for his contribution to Australian Rugby.
 In 2001, he was inducted into the Australian Institute of Sport 'Best of the Best'.
 Eales was inducted into the Sport Australia Hall of Fame in 2003.
 In 2007, he was inducted into the International Rugby Board Hall of Fame.
 Eales was inducted to the Wallaby Hall of Fame in 2011.
Eales was awarded Legend status in the Sport Australia Hall of Fame in 2020.

References

Further reading

External links
 Sporting Heroes Profile
 "The Goal is Success" – Guest editor MyCareer Sydney Morning Herald 11 November 2006

1970 births
Australia international rugby union players
Australian Institute of Sport rugby union players
Australian rugby union captains
Australian rugby union players
Brothers Old Boys players
World Rugby Awards winners
World Rugby Hall of Fame inductees
Living people
Members of the Order of Australia
Sport Australia Hall of Fame inductees
Queensland Reds players
Rugby union locks
University of Queensland alumni
Rugby union players from Brisbane